IHSAA, as an abbreviation or acronym, may refer to the NFHS-accredited high school athletic associations in a number of states:

 Idaho High School Activities Association
 Indiana High School Athletic Association
 Iowa High School Athletic Association